Albrecht Dürer's Visit to Antwerp in 1520 is an 1855 oil on panel painting by Hendrik Leys. As its title suggests, it is based on Albrecht Dürer's attendance at the Antwerp Archers' Guild's Lady's Day procession on Sunday 19 August 1520, as described in his travel journal. It is now in the collection of the Royal Museum of Fine Arts, Antwerp under catalogue number 2198.

References

1855 paintings
Paintings in the collection of the Royal Museum of Fine Arts Antwerp
History paintings
Belgian paintings
Cultural depictions of 15th-century painters
Cultural depictions of 16th-century painters
Cultural depictions of German men
Antwerp in fiction